Kristen Pazik  (born 11 August 1978) is an American and British model.

Pazik married Ukrainian footballer Andriy Shevchenko in July 2004. The couple have four sons, Jordan, Christian, Olexandr and Rider. She, unlike her husband, who is Ukrainian Orthodox, is a Catholic.

Pazik is the daughter of former professional baseball player, Mike Pazik.

References

1978 births
American female models
American people of Polish descent
Association footballers' wives and girlfriends
Living people
People from Minneapolis
Catholics from Minnesota
21st-century American women